The 2022 FIBA Women's Basketball World Cup, the 19th edition of FIBA's premier international tournament for women's national basketball teams, was held in Sydney, Australia, between 22 September and 1 October 2022.

The United States were the three-time defending champion, and retained the title after a finals win over China in front of 15,895 attendants. Host Australia captured the bronze medal with a win against Canada.

The competition recorded the highest number of attendance in history, with 145,519 people attending all games.

Hosts selection
Australia and Russia were the only two federations bidding for the tournament. The decision was made on 26 March 2020 during a video conference.

Venues
The tournament was played at two venues inside the Sydney Olympic Park.

Qualification
Australia as the hosts automatically qualified for the tournament in March 2020. All other teams qualified through qualifying tournaments, after finishing as the top teams during their regional tournament. A total of 12 teams played in those tournaments for the remaining spots.

The shown FIBA ranking indicates the ranking before the tournament.

On 1 March 2022, Russia was dusqualified after being suspended by FIBA due to the invasion of Ukraine, with Puerto Rico being awarded the first wildcard as their replacement on 18 May. 

Nigeria were forced to withdraw in June 2022 due to the political situation in the country, and were replaced by Mali (the runners-up at the African Championship).

Qualified teams

Draw
The official draw ceremony took place on 3 March 2022 in Sydney.

Referees
The following 23 referees were selected for the tournament.

Scott Beker (AUS)
Christopher Reid (AUS)
Andreia Silva (BRA)
Maripier Malo (CAN)
Yu Jung (TPE)
Martin Vulić (CRO)
Maj Forsberg (DEN)
Sara El-Sharnouby (EGY)
Daigo Urushima (JPN)
Yana Nikogossyan (KAZ)
Gatis Saliņš (LAT)
Viola Györgyi (NOR)
Ryan Jones (NZL)
Julio Anaya (PAN)
Wojciech Liszka (POL)
Johnny Batista (PUR)
Yasmina Alcaraz (ESP)
Ariadna Chueca (ESP)
Amir Taboubi (TUN)
Özlem Yalman (TUR)
Amy Bonner (USA)
Blanca Burns (USA)
Joyce Muchenu (ZIM)

Squads

Each team consisted of twelve players.

Preliminary round

Group A

Group B

Knockout stage

Final standings

Statistics and awards

Statistical leaders

Players

Points

Rebounds

Assists

Blocks

Steals

Efficiency

Teams

Points

Rebounds

Assists

Blocks

Steals

Efficiency

Awards
The awards were announced on 1 October 2022.

See also

 2023 FIBA Men's Basketball World Cup

References

External links
Official website

 
2022
World Cup
International sports competitions hosted at Sydney Olympic Park
World Cup
FIBA
2022 in Australian women's sport
September 2022 sports events in Australia
October 2022 sports events in Australia
Sports events affected by the 2022 Russian invasion of Ukraine